In Greek mythology, Aesacus or Aisakos was a son of King Priam of Troy. Aesacus sorrowed for the death of his wife or would-be lover, a daughter of the river Cebren, and was transformed into a seabird.

Mythology

Apollodorus' account 
The Bibliotheca makes Aesacus son of Priam's first wife Arisbe, daughter of Merops. Apollodorus and Tzetzes also make Aesacus a seer who has learned the interpretation of dreams from his grandfather Merops. For them Aesacus is the interpreter of Hecabe's dream when Hecabe gives birth to Paris. In Apollodorus the deceased daughter of Cebren for whom Aesacus mourns is his wife named Asterope.

Ovid's account 
In Ovid's Metamorphoses, Aesacus is an illegitimate son of King Priam secretly born to the nymph Alexirhoe, daughter of the river Granicus. Aesacus avoids Ilium, preferring the countryside. One day he catches sight of the nymph Hesperia, daughter of the river Cebren, falls in love, and pursues her. However, as Hesperia flees, a venomous snake strikes her and she dies. Aesacus, unable to bear living any longer, leaps from a tall cliff into the sea but as he plunges he is changed into a bird by Tethys. Aesacus still attempts to dive into the depth yet continues still to live in the form of a diving bird. The exact identity of the bird, referred to as mergus (later taken as the genus name for merganser ducks) is now unknown, though it has been interpreted as either referring to a cormorant or to Scopoli’s shearwater.

See also
 List of King Priam's children

Notes

References 

 Apollodorus, The Library with an English Translation by Sir James George Frazer, F.B.A., F.R.S. in 2 Volumes, Cambridge, MA, Harvard University Press; London, William Heinemann Ltd. 1921. ISBN 0-674-99135-4. Online version at the Perseus Digital Library. Greek text available from the same website.
 Publius Ovidius Naso, Metamorphoses translated by Brookes More (1859-1942). Boston, Cornhill Publishing Co. 1922. Online version at the Perseus Digital Library.
 Publius Ovidius Naso, Metamorphoses. Hugo Magnus. Gotha (Germany). Friedr. Andr. Perthes. 1892. Latin text available at the Perseus Digital Library.

Trojans
Metamorphoses into birds in Greek mythology
Mythological Greek seers
Children of Priam
Princes in Greek mythology
Metamorphoses characters